The Romantic Journey is a 1916 American silent drama film directed by George Fitzmaurice and starring William Courtenay, Macey Harlam and Alice Dovey.

Cast
 William Courtenay as Peter 
 Macey Harlam as Ratoor 
 Alice Dovey as Cynthia 
 Norman Thorpe as Broadhurst

References

Bibliography
James Robert Parish & Michael R. Pitts. Film directors: a guide to their American films. Scarecrow Press, 1974.

External links
 

1916 films
1916 drama films
1910s English-language films
American silent feature films
Silent American drama films
American black-and-white films
Films directed by George Fitzmaurice
Pathé Exchange films
1910s American films
English-language drama films